The 2010 African U-20 Women's World Cup Qualifying Tournament was the 5th edition of the African U-20 Women's World Cup Qualifying Tournament, the biennial international youth football competition organised by the Confederation of African Football (CAF) to determine which women's under-20 national teams from Africa qualify for the FIFA U-20 Women's World Cup.

Players born on or after 1 January 1990 are eligible to compete in the tournament. The top two teams of the tournament Ghana and Nigeria qualified for the 2010 FIFA U-20 Women's World Cup in Germany as the CAF representatives.

Preliminary round
In this preliminary round, São Tomé and Príncipe withdrew from competition before the start of the 1st leg. As a result, Central African Republic qualified for the next round.

Mozambique, Kenya, Togo, and Sierra Leone all withdrew from preliminary competition.

|}

Uganda won 3−1 on aggregate and advanced to the fisrt round.

Réunion won 7−2 on aggregate and advanced to the fisrt round.

Central African Rep. won on walkover after São Tomé and Príncipe did not appear for the fisrt leg and advanced to the fisrt round.

First round
In the first round, Tunisia, Ghana, and Zambia qualified for the next round after that Egypt, Congo and Uganda withdrew from competition before the start of the 1st leg.

There was no matches due to withdrawal of Mozambique, Kenya, Togo and Sierra Leone. As a result, Zimbabwe and Nigeria qualified for the next round.

|}

DR Congo won 3−1 on aggregate and advanced to the second round.

Namibia won on penalties free kick 4−3 after a draw of 3−3 on aggregate and advanced to the second round.

South Africa won 6−3 on aggregate and advanced to the second round.

Tunisia won on walkover after Egypt did not appear for the fisrt leg and advanced to the second round.

Ghana won on walkover after Congo did not appear for the fisrt leg and advanced to the second round.

Zambia won on walkover after Uganda did not appear for the fisrt leg and advanced to the second round.

Second round

|}

DR Congo won 3−2 on aggregate and advanced to the third round.

Ghana won 3−0 on aggregate and advanced to the third round.

South Africa won 7−2 on aggregate and advanced to the third round.

Nigeria won 10−1 on aggregate and advanced to the third round.

Third round
The winners of the two Third Round matches will qualify directly to the 2010 FIFA U-20 Women's World Cup held in Germany.

|}

Ghana won 5−0 on aggregate and qualified for 2010 FIFA U20 W-WC.

Nigeria won 12−3 on aggregate and qualified for 2010 FIFA U20 W-WC.

Qualified teams for FIFA U-20 Women's World Cup
The following two teams from CAF qualified for the FIFA U-20 Women's World Cup.

References

External links
 Official schedule and results

African U-20 Women's World Cup qualification
CAF
wome
2010 in youth association football